A Christmas to Remember is the thirteenth studio album by Christian music and pop music singer Amy Grant. The album is a collaboration with the Patrick Williams Orchestra. It is Grant's third Christmas album with a blend of some traditional songs but mostly originals.

In 2007, A Christmas to Remember was reissued and digitally remastered by Grant's new record label, EMI/Sparrow Records, along with Grant's 13 other albums. The remastered edition is labeled with a "Digitally Remastered" logo in the 'gutter' on the CD front. Because of Grant's deal with her previous label, Word Records, the remastered editions of A Christmas to Remember and Behind the Eyes was not sold in Christian Music retailers such as Family Christian Stores or Lifeway Christian Resources until 2009. Until 2009, Word Records continued to distribute those titles to Christian retailers in the original, non-remastered editions while EMI distributed the remastered editions to most major retailers. The twelve remaining remastered editions were distributed by EMI to all US retailers, both Christian and secular.

An early release of the CD was sold exclusively at Target Stores and featured a cover of The Carpenters song "Merry Christmas Darling" as a hidden track. This track was eventually re-released on Grant's 2005 compilation Christmas album My Best Christmas.

Track listing

Charts
Album – Billboard (U.S.)

End of year charts

Certifications and sales

References 

1999 Christmas albums
Christmas albums by American artists
Pop Christmas albums
Amy Grant albums
Albums produced by Michael Omartian
A&M Records albums